The Highland Railway K class were the only class of 0-6-0 tender locomotives built for the Highland Railway. They were introduced in 1900, to the design of Peter Drummond. The class were known as 'Barneys'.

Design
They were fairly standard for British practice of the time, inside cylinders with  diameter driving wheels and a general Drummond family appearance.

Construction
The first six (nos. 134 to 139) were built by Dübs and Company in 1900. These had inside bearing double bogie tenders, rather like the watercart designs brother Dugald was supplying on the London and South Western Railway. These were later transferred to C and U class (Ben) locomotives.

Four more (nos. 18 to 21) were supplied by Dübs in 1902. These omitted the watercart tenders but had another Drummond family speciality – cross water tubes in the firebox. No 21 is recorded as retaining this boiler in unmodified form until 1934.

A final pair (nos. 36 and 55) were built by the North British Locomotive Company in 1907.

Transfer to LMS
All passed into London Midland and Scottish Railway (LMS) ownership in 1923. The first was withdrawn in 1936.

Transfer to BR
Seven survived into British Railways (BR) ownership in 1948. The last was withdrawn in 1952.

Numbering

References

Longworth, Hugh (2005) British Railways Steam Locomotives 1948-1968
Vallance, H. A. (1938) The Highland Railway

K
0-6-0 locomotives
Dübs locomotives
NBL locomotives
Railway locomotives introduced in 1900
Scrapped locomotives
Freight locomotives